Anaku, an exercise in Karate.
 Anaku Town, place in Anambra State, Nigeria.
 Anaku (dress), a skirt-type draped garment of indigenous women in the Inca Empire.